The Bad Guys is an album by American jazz saxophonist Roscoe Mitchell and The Note Factory, which was recorded live in 2000 at the Jazz by the Sea Festival in Fano. It was released by the Around Jazz label in 2003.

Track listing
All compositions by Roscoe Mitchell except as indicated
 "Choro Por Merilina" (Stephen Rush) – 7:36
 "Down in the Basement" – 13:35
 "Oh, See How They Run to L.A." – 9:17
 "Do That Dance Called the Tangler" – 15:36
 "The Bad Guys" (Stephen Rush) – 11:10
 "That Would Be Fine" – 4:55

Personnel
Roscoe Mitchell - saxophones
Wadada Leo Smith - trumpet
Matthew Shipp, Craig Taborn - piano
Spencer Barefield - guitar
Jaribu Shahid, Harrison Bankhead - bass
Tani Tabbal, Gerald Cleaver - drums

References

2003 live albums
Roscoe Mitchell live albums